The Centre Cannot Hold is the fifth studio album by Australian musician Ben Frost. It was released on 29 September 2017 through Mute Records.

Accolades

Track listing

References

2017 albums
Ben Frost albums
Mute Records albums
Albums produced by Steve Albini